Federal Route 1266, or Jalan FELDA LB Johnson (formerly Negeri Sembilan state route N68), is a major federal road in Negeri Sembilan, Malaysia.

For most sections, Federal Route 1266 was built under the JKR R5 road standard, allowing a maximum speed limit of up to 90 km/h.

List of junctions

Malaysian Federal Roads
Expressways and highways in the Klang Valley
Sepang District
Roads in Selangor
Transport in Negeri Sembilan